Knodara is a village in the Famagusta District of Cyprus, located 8 km west of Lefkoniko on the main Nicosia-Trikomo highway. It is under the de facto control of Northern Cyprus.

Regularly, a culture and art fest is organized in Knodora. Knodora is also one of the leg of Northern Cyprus Rally Championship

References

Communities in Famagusta District
Populated places in Gazimağusa District